The Royal Commission on Auckland Governance was established by the New Zealand Government to investigate the local government arrangements of Auckland.

The Labour Government of the time announced a Royal Commission into the governance of Auckland on 30 July 2007 and it appointed three Commissioners and terms of reference at the end of October of that year. The Commissioners were David Shand, Peter Salmon, and Dame Margaret Bazley.

The Commission consulted with the public, including Māori, and, along with a raft of other conclusions, suggested the creation of what became known as "the Auckland Supercity", with the setting up of a single Auckland council to replace the Rodney District Council, North Shore City Council, Waitakere City Council, Auckland City Council, Manukau City Council, Papakura District Council, Franklin District Council and the Auckland Regional Council.

The National Party came into power before the Royal Commission released its recommendations. After the release of the Royal Commission report the government made the following high-level decisions:
One unitary Auckland Council as the first tier of governance
One mayor for Auckland (see Mayor of Auckland) with governance powers, elected at large by the region's residents and ratepayers
Twenty councillors to sit on the Auckland Council (eight elected at large and 12 elected from wards)
Twenty to 30 local boards across the region as the second tier of governance
The final number of local boards, and the boundaries of the Auckland Council, wards and local boards to be determined by the Local Government Commission

References

External links
Royal Commission on Auckland Governance
New Zealand Government – "On changes to Auckland Governance"
Department of Internal Affairs – Royal Commission on Auckland Governance page

Politics of the Auckland Region
2007 in New Zealand
2008 in New Zealand
2009 in New Zealand
Royal commissions in New Zealand
History of Auckland